Ramon Veroy Confiado (born March 19, 1968), professionally known as Mon Confiado, is a Filipino character actor, theater actor and businessman who has appeared in both mainstream and independent films. He is the son of late veteran actor Ángel Confiado from a second family.

Confiado graduated with a degree in Civil Engineering at the Mapúa Institute of Technology. He practices method acting and had also starred in a handful of international films. Having started his acting career in the early 1990s, Confiado has been nominated and won numerous acting awards both internationally and locally.

Filmography

Film

Television

Awards and nominations

References

External links

Living people
Filipino male television actors
Filipino male stage actors
People from Sampaloc, Manila
Male actors from Manila
Filipino male film actors
1968 births
Method actors
ABS-CBN personalities
GMA Network personalities
TV5 (Philippine TV network) personalities